Apatophysis danczenkoi is a species of beetle in the family Cerambycidae, in the subgenus Apatophysis. It can be found in the country of Iran.

References
http://www.globalspecies.org/ntaxa/172427

Dorcasominae